Lewis or Lew Beck may refer to:

Lewis Caleb Beck (1798–1853), American physician, botanist, chemist, and mineralogist
Lew Beck (basketball) (1922–1970), American 1948 Summer Olympics gold medalist in basketball
Lewis White Beck (1913–1997), American scholar in German philosophy